Jose Manuel "Anel" Paz is an Argentinian guitarist, singer, songwriter, producer, and recording and mix engineer.
He has been a member of Los Violadores, and Los Politicos.

Currently, he is the bandleader of El General Paz & La Triple Frontera (GP3F).
He graduated "With Honors" at Musicians Institute (Los Angeles, USA), where he was a student of Scott Henderson, Frank Gambale, Paul Gilbert, Joe Diorio, among other maestros.

He has been awarded prizes such as Lápiz de Oro (fifteen times), Lápiz de Platino (five times), a Disco de Oro (Gold Record), Premios Jerry Goldenberg a la Excelencia en las Comunicaciones (three times), among other awards.

He was appointed international endorser by Ibanez guitars, a nomination for the first time granted to an Argentine artist. Anel was shown in 2005 Ibanez's catalogue, alongside maestros such as George Benson, Marty Friedman, Paul Gilbert, Pat Metheny, Joe Satriani, John Scofield, and Steve Vai.

Beginnings 
Anel Paz was born in the neighborhood of Parque Patricios, Buenos Aires, Argentina as the son of José Manuel Paz and Norma Isabel Bernardez, the eldest of four brothers.

Since his childhood, he was fascinated by music and musical instruments. His parents supported his vocation, and when he was six years old he was sent to study music and flute to Collegium Musicum.

His family moved to the neighborhood of Flores and at this time of playing soccer in the streets, encouraged by his parents, he listened to classical music, jazz, tango, folk, rock, Brazilian music, artists such as Franz Liszt, Elvis Presley, José Larralde, Paco de Lucia, Eduardo Falu, Sergio Mendez, Frank Sinatra.

At 13 years old, now living in Caballito, he was attracted by the sound and soul of the electric guitar. He discovered artists who influenced him deeply: Carlos Santana, Jimi Hendrix, Led Zeppelin, Deep Purple, Van Halen, Frank Zappa, Pink Floyd, Rush, Luis Alberto Spinetta, Jeff Beck, Queen, and African-American blues.
When he was 15 he received as a Christmas gift his first electric guitar, and from that moment he founded several garage bands and played with them in shows, school and neighborhood festivals. Some of these garage bands were: Los Espasmódicos, Dr. Rock, Océano, Cognac.

He began his music studies at the Conservatorio Superior de Música Manuel de Falla, and learnt harmony, composition, classical guitar, electric guitar, with several teachers, including, Luis Venosa, Juan Carlos Cirigliano, María Isabel Siewers, Sebastián Piana and Claudio Camisassa.
In these years classical music, jazz, fusion and hard rock attracted him: Chopin, Bach, Beethoven, Ravel, Debussy, Albéniz, Leo Brouwer, Randy Rhoads, Serú Giran, Yngwie Malmsteen, Steve Vai, Heitor Villa-Lobos, Mozart, George Benson, Allan Holdsworth, Pat Metheny, John Coltrane, Yes, Charlie Parker, Prince, John Scofield, Miles Davis were his influences.

Years later, the Conservatory rewarded him, choosing Anel to play in a Master Class offered by the great Eduardo Falu.

After this event, he received support from his parents to study at the Musicians Institute in Los Angeles, USA.
At the Guitar Institute of Technology (GIT), Musician Institute, he studied with Norman Brown, Joe Diorio, Frank Gambale, Paul Gilbert, Scott Henderson, Carl Shroeder, Peter Sprague, among others.
He attended seminars with Albert Lee, Al Di Meola, Carl Verheyen, Jennifer Batten, Joe Pass, Robben Ford, Tommy Tedesco, Steve Trovato, and others.

In 1988 he graduated "With Honors" at the Musicians Institute.

Back to Argentina 
Back in Argentina in 1989 he created, with Ricardo Saul, his own music production company: "Raya Diseño de Música y Sonido”. In these years he received several national and international awards, including four times Lápiz de Oro.

He contributed to the creation of the I.T.M.C. (Instituto Tecnológico de Música Contemporánea, certified in Argentina by Musicians Institute), founded by his friend and classmate of G.I.T., Diego Temprano. Anel was instructor and Director of Studies of the Institute.

In the following years, he participated in albums as a guitarist, producer, and arranger, including Enrique Pinti, and Nacha Guevara among other artists.

Los Violadores 
In 1995 he was summoned by Robert "Polaco" Zelazek to become part of Los Violadores, punk band pioneer of the genre in Latin America, to replace guitar player Gustavo "Stuka" Fossa.

With Los Violadores, he recorded and co-produced the album "Otra Patada en los Huevos", and he formed part of the historic return shows of the band at Cemento, in December 1995.

In the following years, they performed shows, music videos, and tours.

In 1997 he recorded a guitar solo version of Hymn to San Martín for electric guitar and orchestra, which was widely broadcast by Mario Pergolini in Radio Rock & Pop

SuperGaucho 
In 1998 he created, with Fernando Buriasco, SuperGaucho Records, his own indie label and recording studios, where several artists recorded albums, including Cacho Tirao.

He produced, composed and recorded "Conversacional", Romina Vitale’s first album, and participated in videos and shows as guitar player and music director.

He was recording engineer in the Los Fabulosos Cadillacs's albums "Hola" and "Chau".

Los Políticos 
In 1999 he formed his own band, Los Políticos, he recorded an eponymous album and participated in videos and shows of the band.

Ibanez Guitars 
He was appointed international endorser by Ibanez guitars, a nomination for the first time granted to an Argentine guitarist. Anel appeared at 2005 Ibanez's catalogue alongside artists such as George Benson, Joe Satriani, John Scofield, Marty Friedman, Pat Metheny, Paul Gilbert, and Steve Vai.

In those years he conducted seminars and workshops about improvisation and production, including the Ibanez Guitar Explosion 2003 with Marty Friedman.

Supercharango 
In 2003, with Fernando Buriasco, Gianni Dusio and Nicolas Diaz, he created Supercharango, music production company, where he produced and recorded albums for various artists including 12 Monos, "Generacion Pulgar" of Nerdkids, and "Autoayuda" of Sergio Pángaro y Baccarat.

He participated in the music production for films such as "Luisa," "El Dedo", "El Ultimo Elvis" (directed by Armando Bo) in which Anel was the producer of the Elvis Presley songs’ re-creation).

In 2007, 2009 and 2011 Supercharango was awarded Mejor Productora de Música (Best Music Production Company) with a Premio Jerry Goldenberg a la Excelencia en la Comunicaciones.

Also, Supercharango received eleven Lápiz de Oro, five Lápiz de Platino, a Gold Record, and a Gold FIAP, among other awards.

In these years he worked as a recording engineer on several albums, including: La Tabaré "18 Años" (also participating as a guest musician), Ratones Paranoicos "Enigma", Joaquin Sabina "Nos Sobran los Motivos", Sandro "Para Mamá, Sandro "Para Mamá Vol. 2”, Sandro "Recién Ayer", Sandro "Amor Gitano", Sandro "Secretamente Palabras de Amor", Turf "Para Mi, Para Vos Reversiones" (with Charly García, Los Tipitos, Villanos, among other guest artists).

El General Paz & La Triple Frontera (GP3F) 
In 2007 Anel founded his new band El General Paz & La Triple Frontera (GP3F), a multicultural group integrating musicians from several countries, where they fuse rock, funk, jazz, Latin American song and folklore, creating an original and contemporary style.

Since then, GP3F has been performing shows at many venues in several countries.

Currently, the band is recording their 3rd studio album.

GP3F has toured various scenarios, including:

- Opening act for Gilberto Gil at Teatro Gran Rex 2008 (Argentina)

- Pepsi Music 2008 (Argentina)

- CM Vivo at Canal de la Música 2009 (Argentina)

- Pepsi Music 2009 (Argentina)

- Primer Festival Itinerante de World Music 2010 (Argentina)

- Opening act of Dominic Miller 2011 (Argentina)

- Pepsi Music 2011 (Argentina)

- Quilmes Rock 2013 (Argentina)

- Rock BA 2015 (Argentina)

- South by Southwest SXSW 2015 (USA)

- Bulldog Café 2015-2016-2017 (México)

- CM Vivo en el Canal de la Música 2015 (Argentina) (click to watch the show)

- Festival Brahva de San Marcos 2016 (Guatemala)

- Festival Internacional Cervantino 2016 (México)

- Feria Internacional del Libro 2016 (México)

- Personal Fest Verano 2017 (Argentina)

- Vive Latino 2017 (México)

- TV Brasil - Todas As Bossas (Brasil)

- Feira Expomusic 2017 (Brasil)

- Personal Fest 2017 (Argentina)

- Festival de la Cerveza de Guadalajara 2019 (México)

Full Pampa 
In 2013 Anel created his own production studio, Full Pampa, dedicated to artistic production and recording.

In Full Pampa he has worked with several artists, including: Banda de Turistas, Diemen Noord, the cycle CMTV Acústicos, El General Paz & La Triple Frontera (GP3F), Enrique Pinti, La Burrita Cumbión, Liliana Herrero, LIMON, Marcelo Ezquiaga, No Compro Más, Siderales, Surfistas del Sistema, among other artists.

In 2016 he was jury of the contest "Camino a Abbey Road".

In 2017 Anel was designated endorser by Tagima guitars.

Discography

Producer 
Producer of:
 12 Monos
 Banda de Turistas
 Deja Vu
 Diemen Noord
 El General Paz & La Triple Frontera
 La Burrita Cumbión
 LIMON
 Los Políticos
 Los Violadores
 Marcelo Ezquiaga
 Nerdkids
 No Compro Más
 Pablo Agustin
 Romina Vitale
 Sergio Pángaro y Baccarat
 Siderales
 Surfistas del Sistema
 among others

Has participated in further musical productions
 including Enrique Pinti
 Nacha Guevara

Recording, Mix, and/or Mastering Engineer 
Recording, Mix, and/or Mastering Engineer of:

 12 Monos
 Alejandro Lerner
 Banda de Turistas
 Cacho Tirao
 CMTV Acústicos (Airbag - Ángela Leiva - Árbol - Attaque 77 - Bahiano - Bambi Charpentier - Bulldog - Carajo - César Banana Pueyrredón - Contravos - Coti Sorokin - Déborah De Corral - Diemen Noord - El Bordo - Emanero - Estelares - Horcas - In Corp Sanctis - La Mississippi - Leo García - Los Nocheros - Los Totora - Mancha de Rolando - Massacre - Miguel Zavaleta Suéter - Militta Bora - Nahuel - Pablo López - Pampa Yacuza - Ráfaga - Rodrigo de la Serna y El Yotivenco - Roma - Roque Narvaja y La Joven Guardia - Salta la Banca - Sebastian Yatra - Sie7e - Todo Aparenta Normal - Vanthra - Vox Dei)
 Celeste Carballo
 Charly García
 Diemen Noord
 El General Paz & La Triple Frontera
 Jairo
 Joaquín Sabina
 La Burrita Cumbión
 La Tabaré
 Liliana Herrero
 LIMON
 Los Fabulosos Cadillacs
 Los Pericos
 Los Políticos
 Ratones Paranoicos
 Los Tipitos
 Los Violadores
 Luciano Pereyra
 Marcelo Ezquiaga
 Memphis La Blusera
 Nerdkids
 No Compro Más
 Pablo Agustin
 Romina Vitale
 Sandro
 Sergio Pángaro y Baccarat
 Siderales
 Surfistas del Sistema
 Turf
 Villanos
 among other artists. 

Several of these albums were certified with Gold, Platinum, and Multi-Platinum sales.

References

External links 

 Anel Paz Facebook
Anel Paz Instagram
GP3F en CM Vivo, El Canal de la Música, 2015
Musicians Institute - Notable Alumni
GP3F en Todas As Bossas, TV Brasil, 2017

gp3f.net

Argentine rock musicians
Argentine record producers
Argentine guitarists
Argentine male guitarists
1963 births
Living people
Musicians Institute alumni